Jhanjha was Shilahara  ruler of north Konkan branch from 910 CE – 930 CE.

Vappuvanna  was followed by Jhanjha . He is mentioned by Al-Masudi as ruling over Samur (i.e., Chaul in the Kolaba district) in 916 CE. He was a very devout Shaiva. He is said to have built twelve temples of Shiva and named them after himself. According to an unpublished copper-plate in the possession of Pandit Bhagwanlal, Jhanjha had a daughter named Lasthiyavva who was married to Bhillam, the fourth king of the Chandor .(Dept. Gazetteer: 2002)

See also
 Shilahara

References
 Bhandarkar R.G. (1957): Early History of Deccan, Sushil Gupta (I) Pvt Ltd, Calcutta.
 Fleet J.F. (1896): The Dynasties of the Kanarese District of The Bombay Presidency, Written for the Bombay Gazetteer.
 Department of Gazetteer, Govt of Maharashtra (2002): Itihaas : Prachin Kal, Khand -1 (Marathi)
 Department of Gazetteer, Govt of Maharashtra (1960): Kolhapur District Gazetteer
 Department of Gazetteer, Govt of Maharashtra (1964): Kolaba District Gazetteer
 Department of Gazetteer, Govt of Maharashtra (1982): Thane District Gazetteer
 A.S.Altekar (1936): The Silaharas of Western India

External links
 Silver Coin of Shilaharas of Southern Maharashtra (Coinex 2006 - Souvenir)

Shilahara dynasty
10th-century rulers in Asia